Bernard Edward Joseph Capes (30 August 1854 – 2 November 1918) was an English author.

Biography
Capes was born in London, one of eleven children: his elder sister, Harriet Capes, was a noted translator and author of more than a dozen children's books.  His uncle, John Moore Capes, was President of the Oxford Union while attending Balliol College, Oxford and published a semi-autobiographical novel. His grandfather, John Capes, had converted to Roman Catholicism, so Capes was brought up a Catholic, and educated at the Catholic college Beaumont College. However, he rapidly 'gave this up'.

Capes was a prolific Victorian author, publishing more than forty volumes – romances, mysteries, poetry, history – together with many articles for the magazines of the day. His early writing career was as a journalist, later becoming editor of the monthly magazine The Theatre, the most highly regarded British dramatic periodical of its time. Other magazines for which Capes wrote included Blackwood's, Butterfly, Cassell's, Cornhill Magazine, Hutton's Magazine, Illustrated London News, Lippincott's, Macmillan's Magazine, Literature, New Witness, Pall Mall Magazine, Pearson's Magazine, The Idler, The New Weekly, and The Queen.

Capes wrote numerous ghost stories, which were later rediscovered by anthologist Hugh Lamb in the 1970s. His 1899 story "The Black Reaper" features a supernatural personification of Death. Capes also wrote historical novels. Love Like A Gipsy (1901) is set during the American Revolution. Capes' Bembo: A Tale of Italy  is a novel takes place during the reign of Galeazzo Sforza, the fifteenth-century Duke of Milan.

He finally committed to writing novels full-time, taking around four months for each novel. On several occasions he had two or three novels published in the same year – and even four in 1910. His first success came in 1897, when he entered a $30,000 competition for new authors sponsored by the Chicago Record. He was awarded second prize for The Mill of Silence, published by Rand, McNally that year. The following year the Chicago Record ran the competition again, and this time Capes won it with The Lake of Wine, published by Heinemann.

He died in the 1918 'flu epidemic.  A memorial plaque commemorating his life is in Winchester Cathedral (where he worked in the years leading up to his death), affixed to the wall by the door which leads to the crypt.

Capes' son Renalt Capes (1905-1983), and grandsons, also (Dr) Renalt Capes (1956-), Ian Bernard and Graham Burns, are also published authors.

Works
(Information supplied by Capes's grandson Ian Bernard Graham Burns)
The Haunted Tower (as 'Bevis Cane'), Spencer Blackett, London, 1888
The Missing Man (as 'Bevis Cane'), Eglington & Co, 1889
The Mill of Silence, Rand, McNally & Company, Chicago, 1897
The Lake of Wine, Heinemann, 1897, 8 editions published between 1898 and 1931 and held by 23 libraries worldwide
Adventures of the Comte de Muette, William Blackwood and Sons, Edinburgh, 1898, 9 editions published in 1898 and held by 35 libraries worldwide
The Mysterious Singer, J.W. Arrowsmith,
Our Lady of Darkness, Wm Blackwood, 1898
At a Winter's Fire, Arthur Pearson, 1899, Short Stories, 13 editions published between 1899 and 2006 and held by 173 libraries worldwide, (e-issued, 1978, by Ayer Co Publishing (USA)
From Door to Door, Wm Blackwood, 1900, Short Stories
Joan Brotherhood, C. A. Pearson, London, 1900
Love Like a Gypsy, Archibald Constable & Co, Westminster, 1901
Plots, Methuen & Co, London, 1902, Short Stories
A Castle in Spain, Smith, Elder & Co, London, 1903
The Secret in the Hill, Smith, Elder & Co, London, 1903
The Extraordinary Confessions of Diana Please, Methuen & Co, 1904
A Jay of Italy, Methuen, 1905, 7 editions published between 1905 and 1995 and held by 22 libraries worldwide
The Romance of Lohengrin, Dean and Son, 1906(?)
Bembo: A Tale of Italy, Dutton & Co., NY, 1906, 2 editions published in 1906 and held by 33 libraries worldwide
Loaves and Fishes (2nd edition 1906), 1906, Short Stories
A Rogue's Tragedy, Methuen & Co, London 1906
The Green Parrot, Smith, Elder & Co, 1908
Amaranthus: A Book of Little Songs, T. Fisher Unwin, 1908
The Love Story of St Bel, 1909
The Great Skene Mystery, Methuen & Co, 1909
Why Did He Do It?, 1910
Historical Vignettes, 1st Series, T. Fisher Unwin, 1910, 13 editions published between 1904 and 1965 in English and Czech and held by 57 libraries worldwide
Jemmy Abercraw, Methuen, 1910
The Will and the Way, John Murray, London, 1910
The Will and the Way, John Murray, London, 1910*Gilead Balm, T. Fisher Unwin, 1911, 4 editions published in 1911 and held by 28 libraries worldwide
The House of Many Voices, T. Fisher Unwin, London, 1911
Jessie Bazley, Constable and Company, London, 1912
Historical Vignettes, 2nd Series, Sidgwick & Jackson, 1912
Bag and Baggage, Constable, 1912
The Pot of Basil, Constable and Company, 1913
The Story of Fifine, Constable, 1914 (re-issued 1919)
The Fabulists, Mills & Boon, London, 1915, Short Stories
Moll Davis, George Allen & Unwin, 1916
If Age Could, Duckworth and Co, London, 1916
Where England Sets Her Feet, 1918
A Fool’s Passion and Other Poems
The Skeleton Key, W. Collins Sons, London, 1919, 8 editions published between 1919 and 1929 in English and held by 30 libraries worldwide.  Re-issued as The Mystery of the Skeleton Key, HarperCollins, London, September 2015
The Black Reaper, ed Hugh Lamb, Equation, Wellingborough, 1989, held by 25 libraries worldwide
The Black Reaper, ed Hugh Lamb, Ash-Tree Press, Ashcroft, British Columbia, 1998
Dancing Shadows, Coachwhip Publications, Landisville, Pennsylvania, 2011
Twists and Turns: Tales of Mystery, Adventure, Crime, and Humor, Coachwhip Publications, 2011

Uncollected Stories
The following stories are not included in the six short story collections:-
Wanted—A Bicycle. The Strand Magazine Vol. 17, June 1899
Dunberry Bells. @ Papers Past New Zealand Newspapers, 26 July 1902
As a Fly in Amber. The Illustrated London News, 9 December 1905. Also @ Papers Past
The Diamond George. The Illustrated London News, 14–21 July 1906. Also @ Trove Australia Newspapers
Love and the Belt. The London Magazine Vol.17, 1906. Also @ Trove
The Vanishing Cheques. The London Magazine Vol.18, 1907. First published separately 1904 London: Daily Mail
Norah's Secret. Cardiff Times, 15 February 1908. Also @ Trove
Forfeits. @ Papers Past, 9 January 1909
The Tell-Tale Hall-Mark. @ Trove, 21 December 1912
St. Sigebert's Chimney. @ Trove, 6 September 1913
A Popular Success. @ Trove, 12 March 1914

Notes

References
The Black Reaper, ed. Hugh Lamb, Equation, Wellingborough, 1989
The Black Reaper, ed. Hugh Lamb, Ash-Tree Press, Ashcroft, British Columbia

External links

 
 
 
 
 
 

1854 births
1918 deaths
Deaths from the Spanish flu pandemic in the United Kingdom
English male journalists
19th-century English novelists
20th-century English novelists
English short story writers
English horror writers
Ghost story writers
English historical novelists
Writers of historical fiction set in the Middle Ages
Writers of historical fiction set in the early modern period
English male short story writers
English male novelists
19th-century British short story writers
19th-century English male writers
20th-century British short story writers
20th-century English male writers